Joshua Davis (born 1974) is an American writer, film producer and co-founder of Epic Magazine.

Early life 
Davis is the son of Miss Nevada winner Janet Hadland and Highlander film producer Peter S. Davis. Davis attended Stanford University, where he double majored in Economics and Modern Thought and Literature.

Career 
Davis wrote the New York Times bestselling book Spare Parts, which grew out of his article "La Vida Robot." The story follows the lives of four teenage immigrants who built an underwater robot. The book was a finalist for Columbia University's J. Anthony Lukas Book Prize and was adapted into the movie Spare Parts by Lionsgate starring George Lopez, Jamie Lee Curtis and Marisa Tomei. It premiered in January 2015.

In 2012, Davis was kidnapped in Libya while reporting an article for Mens Journal. Later that year, he lived with John McAfee in Belize and documented McAfee's lifestyle and legal problems, including allegations of murder. In 2003, Davis covered the Iraq war for Wired. For The New Yorker in 2011, Davis wrote about bitcoin when the cryptocurrency was worth five dollars. He has also profiled Elon Musk multiple times, including a 2010 Wired cover story and in an early in-depth article about Tesla.

Davis' first book, The Underdog, was published by Random House in 2005. It chronicles Davis' entry into unusual competitions around the world, including the US Sumo Open and the World Armwrestling Championship in Gdynia, Poland. Davis documented his time as a competitive arm wrestler in the film "The Beast Within," which won best documentary at the Telluride Mountain Film Festival. 

In 2013, Davis and Joshuah Bearman formed Epic Magazine, a magazine and production company specializing in unusual true stories. Davis and Bearman have sold more than twenty articles to Hollywood, with two films produced. Davis, in partnership with J. J. Abrams and Bad Robot, also produced the short documentary series "Moon Shot," which chronicles the work of those competing for the Google Lunar X Prize.

Awards 
In 2014, Davis was selected as a Finalist for a National Magazine Award in Feature Writing. In 2021, he was nominated for an Independent Spirit Award as an executive producer of Little America. He lives in San Francisco, California.

Filmography

Bibliography

Books 

 The Underdog, 2006 
 Entrenched, 2011
 McAfee's Last Stand, 2012 

 Spare Parts: Four Undocumented Teenagers, One Ugly Robot, and the Battle for the American Dream, 2014

Articles 
"If We Run Out Of Batteries, This War Is Screwed," Wired, June 1, 2003
"La Vida Robot," Best of Technology Writing, 2006
"Say Hello to Stanley," Best of Technology Writing, 2007
"Face Blind," Best American Science Writing, 2007
"The Untold Story of the World's Biggest Diamond Heist," Wired, March 12, 2009
"The Crypto Currency," The New Yorker, October 10, 2011
"Fox Makes Epic First-Look Deal for Online Venture for Film Centric Journalism," Deadline, August 19, 2013
"Magazine Writing, On the Web, for Film," The New York Times, August 11, 2013
"The Mercenary," Medium, August 19, 2013
"Building An Epic Brand Around Incredible True Stories," Fast Company, August 23, 2013
"Pipino: Gentleman Thief," Epic Magazine, 2014
"Deep Sea Cowboys," Epic Magazine, 2017 
"Arab Spring Break," Epic Magazine, 2017

References

External links
Joshua Davis' Homepage
Epic Magazine
Underdog Nation

1974 births
Living people
American documentary filmmakers
American male journalists
American memoirists
American technology writers